Brož (feminine Brožová) is a Czech surname. Notable people with this name include:

 Antonín Brož, Czech luger
 František Brož, Czech violist and conductor
 František Brož (athlete), Czech athlete
 Ludmila Brožová-Polednová, Czech communist prosecutor
 Lukáš Brož, Czech luger
 Michal Brož, Czech athlete
 Jaroslav Brož (athlete), Czech athlete
 Jaroslav Brož (cyclist), Czech cyclist

See also 
 Asteroid 16244 Brož, named after Czech celestial mechanician Miroslav Brož (born 1976)

Czech-language surnames